Cecil Claude Farrer, 3rd Baron Farrer  (8 May 1893 – 11 March 1948), was the third Baron Farrer.

Background
He was the son of Thomas Farrer, 2nd Baron Farrer, and his first wife Evelyn Spring Rice, daughter of the Hon. Charles Spring Rice, son of Thomas Spring Rice, 1st Baron Monteagle of Brandon.

Life
He was educated at Eton College and New College, Oxford (MA 1914). In 1917 he was appointed to the Order of the British Empire as an Officer (OBE).  He succeeded his father as Baron Farrer upon his father's death in 1940.  He was Honorary Treasurer of the Commons, Open Space and Footpaths Preservation Society; Member of Box Hill Committee and Leith Hill Committee of the National Trust.  Upon his death in 1948 he was succeeded by his half-brother Oliver Farrer, 4th Baron Farrer.

Marriage
He married in 1919 Evelyn Hilda Perry, but they had no issue.

References 

 ‘FARRER’, Who Was Who, A & C Black, 1920–2008; online edn, Oxford University Press, December 2007, accessed 20 May 2011.

1893 births
1948 deaths
Officers of the Order of the British Empire
People educated at Eton College
Alumni of New College, Oxford
Barons in the Peerage of the United Kingdom